Angelina "Helen" de Luna Tan, (born Angelina Beredo de Luna) is a Filipina physician and politician who is the incumbent governor of Quezon. She previously served as a three-time congresswoman of Quezon's 4th district from 2013 to 2022 when she was elected in 2022 to become Quezon's new governor, becoming the first woman to hold the office.

Political career

House of Representatives (20132022)

Tan ran in Quezon's 4th congressional district in 2013 under United Nationalist Alliance and won. She was re-elected in 2016 and in 2019, then  under Nationalist People's Coalition. During her tenure as a congresswoman, Tan filed notable bills such as Comprehensive Tuberculosis Elimination Plan Act, Physician Act, Mandatory PhilHealth Coverage for All Senior Citizens, and the House Bill No. 6633. In 2019, she became the chairman of the House of Representatives' House Committee on Health. Not long after, Tan was removed from the chairmanship, being replaced by Guimaras representative Ma. Lucille Nava. Tan was able to regain the chairmanship as she was elected again to be the committee chair. Tan has led the passage of notable bills as a chairman such as  the Universal Health Care Law and the ratification of Tobacco Excise Tax.

Governor of Quezon (2022Present)
Tan ran for governor of Quezon in 2022 2022, challenging incumbent Danilo Suarez, who was seeking reelection. She had Lucena councilor Anacleto Alcala III as her running mate for vice governor. She won in all 39 municipalities and 2 cities, and garnered around 790,534 votes over Suarez's 320,296 votes. Tan became the first woman to hold the post.

Personal life 
Tan is married to Ronnel Tan, an engineer and regional director for the Department of Public Works and Highways, and have 2 children. Their son, Keith Micah ("Atorni Mike"), succeeded her as representative for Quezon's 4th congressional district in 2022.

References 

Governors of Quezon
Living people
Members of the House of Representatives of the Philippines from Quezon
Nationalist People's Coalition politicians
Politicians from Quezon
United Nationalist Alliance politicians
Women provincial governors of the Philippines
Filipino women medical doctors
Year of birth missing (living people)